Das Kapital is the twelfth studio album by Brazilian rock band Capital Inicial, released on June 2, 2010 through Sony Music. The album shares its title with the homonymous book written by Karl Marx.

Track listing

Personnel

Capital Inicial 
 Fê Lemos: drums
 Flávio Lemos: bass guitar
 Dinho Ouro Preto: lead and backing vocals
 Yves Passarell: electric guitar, backing vocals

Additional musicians 
 Fabiano Carelli: electric guitar
 Robledo Silva: keyboards, piano, backing vocals
 Lineu Andrade: acoustic guitar
 Koool G Murder (Eels): keyboards

References

Capital Inicial albums
2010 albums
Sony Music Brazil albums